The 2007–08 Memphis Tigers men's basketball team represented the University of Memphis in the 2007–08 college basketball season, the 87th season of Tiger basketball. The Tigers were coached by eighth-year head coach John Calipari, and they played their home games at the FedExForum in Memphis, Tennessee. The team was the most successful in Tigers' history reaching the NCAA Championship game for the second time and setting numerous school records. It is also one of the most successful in college basketball history, setting the record for most wins in a season at 38–2. 

However, all wins were vacated in 2009 after an investigation into the eligibility of Derrick Rose and the Tigers officially finished the season 0–1.

Season summary

Non-conference play
The Tigers began the season ranked No. 3 as a result of a strong recruiting class led by Derrick Rose and returning veteran stars Chris Douglas-Roberts and Joey Dorsey.  To start non-conference play, the Tigers defeated powerhouses Oklahoma and Connecticut in the 2K College Hoops Classic at Madison Square Garden in New York. On the same court in the Jimmy V Classic, they won an overtime thriller over USC led by O. J. Mayo. On December 22, they defeated No. 5 Georgetown by 14 and No. 17 Arizona the next week. On January 21, the undefeated Tigers were ranked No. 1 by both major polls after a loss by number-one North Carolina. The Tigers started the season 26–0, the best start to a season in Memphis history.

Conference play
Entering conference play, the Tigers were predicted to match the previous years undefeated run in the conference. Memphis started the season 26–0, the best in history. However, the record start was tested in a mid-season, non-conference bout against in-state rival No. 2 Tennessee.  In a highly anticipated No. 1 vs. No. 2 matchup covered by ESPN Gameday, the Volunteers beat the top-ranked Tigers at home 62–66.  The Tigers finished Conference USA play undefeated for the second straight year, and won the conference tournament for the third straight year. Memphis finished the season with a 38-1 record and became the Conference USA regular season champions.

NCAA tournament
In the NCAA tournament Memphis received the No. 1 seed in the South. In opening rounds in Little Rock, they defeated No. 16-seeded Texas–Arlington and 8-seed Mississippi State. They moved on to regionals in Houston where they defeated No. 5 seed Michigan State. In the regional final, they knocked off a No. 2-seeded Texas team playing near to its home in Austin. In the Final Four, Memphis beat UCLA and proceeded to the national championship game. The Tigers fell in overtime to Kansas, 68–75 after a game-tying three-pointer at the regulation buzzer by Kansas star Mario Chalmers. 

Chris Douglas-Roberts was named a first-team All-American, and prospective number-one draft pick Derrick Rose was named to the third team. The Tigers finished the season 38–2 (16–0), as Conference USA regular season and tournament champions. The 38 wins broke a record shared by the 1986 Duke Blue Devils, 1987 UNLV Runnin' Rebels, and 2005 Illinois Fighting Illini for the most wins in NCAA Division I history. It would be matched later by the 2012 and 2015 Kentucky Wildcats.

NCAA investigation
The NCAA determined in 2009 that Derrick Rose had forfeited his eligibility because the Educational Testing Service voided Rose's SAT Reasoning Test score that made him eligible to play at Memphis. Additionally, the NCAA determined that even without the questions about Rose's SAT score, Rose would have lost his eligibility in December 2007 due to his brother being allowed to travel with the team for free.  All 38 wins and one NCAA tournament loss were subsequently vacated by the NCAA for rules violations, leaving the team with an official record of 0–1. The NCAA also made Memphis remove banners commemorating the 2008 season. This included a banner commemorating three seniors who finished the season with the most wins by any player in NCAA history with 137 from 2005 to 2009. Memphis also forfeited all NCAA tournament revenues.

Recruiting class

Roster

Schedule 

|-
!colspan=6 style=| Regular season

|-
!colspan=6 style=|Conference USA Tournament

|-
!colspan=6 style=|2008 NCAA tournament

See also
 List of vacated and forfeited games in college basketball

Notes
  Due to NCAA sanctions, Memphis had 33 regular season wins, 5 tournament wins and 1 tournament loss vacated from the 2007–08 season.  The team's pre-sanctions record was 38–2.  The "official" record therefore stands as 0-1.

References

Memphis Tigers men's basketball seasons
Memphis
NCAA Division I men's basketball tournament Final Four seasons
Memphis
Memphis
Memphis